The Memorandum of Independence of Macedonia is a document published on March 1, 1913 by four former members of the Macedonian Scientific and Literary Society. They insisted on the independence of the modern region of Macedonia.

Its name, which disappeared during the period of Ottoman rule, was revived in the 19th century. Its boundaries, which have changed considerably over the time, also came to be redefined during the same period. The document was addressed to the Secretary of State for Foreign Affairs of the United Kingdom, Edward Grey, the ambassadors in the palace in London and the Minister of Foreign Affairs of the Russian Empire and was signed by Dimitrija Čupovski, Aleksandar Vezenkov, Gavril Konstantinovich and Nace Dimov. In addition, Čupovski drew a political-geographic map of Macedonia "into its natural, geographical, ethnic and economic boundaries", which was attached to the Memorandum. The document, among other things, says:

See also 
Macedonian nationalism
Macedonian Question

References

1913 documents
Memoranda
History of Macedonia (region)
1913 in Europe
Macedonian Scientific and Literary Society